Hans-Dieter Brüchert (born 18 August 1952) is a retired German freestyle wrestler. Between 1974 and 1976 he won two silver and two bronze medals at major international competitions, including a silver at the 1976 Olympics.

In 1978 Brüchert graduated in physical education from the Deutsche Hochschule für Körperkultur. In 1980 he retired from competitions, and until 1981 coached wrestlers in Potsdam. Between 1981 and 1989 he worked as a sports teacher, and after that as headmaster at a school in Michendorf.

References

1952 births
Living people
Olympic wrestlers of East Germany
Wrestlers at the 1976 Summer Olympics
German male sport wrestlers
Olympic silver medalists for East Germany
Olympic medalists in wrestling
Medalists at the 1976 Summer Olympics
World Wrestling Championships medalists
Sportspeople from Mecklenburg-Western Pomerania